John Young (11 March 1811 – 12 April 1878) was a member of the Legislative Assembly of the Province of Canada and a member of Parliament of the House of Commons of Canada.

Early life 

Young was born in Ayr, Scotland. His family had no particular social position or money. His father William was a cooper by trade.

He was able to qualify for a very fine school, Ayr Academy. That school boasts a number of distinguished graduates including the poet Robbie Burns, the inventor James Watt and the shipowner and Liberal MP, William Schaw Lindsay. Although Lindsay was three or four years Young's junior, they were acquainted during their time at the Academy. The formal education of John Young ended when he was only 14. He left Ayr Academy to become a teacher at a small country school  in the nearby village of Coylton. After only a year of teaching he came to Canada in 1826 at the age of 15.

His early life in Canada began in Kingston, Ontario, where he was employed by a company in the import/export business. Despite his youth and lack of formal education he was very successful. It appears that the energy, determination, and the supreme self-confidence that were to characterize his later career were already evident.

Beliefs 
The Torrence firm, Young's employer, moved him to Montreal in 1830. After a few years he was made co-partner with David Torrance, the son of the owner. In addition to the import/export business, the Torrance family had interests in the steamboat business operating on the St. Lawrence between Montreal and Quebec City. This involvement with merchandise trade and shipping were the foundation of Young's lifelong passion for improved transportation.

Young believed that the future of Montreal as the pre-eminent commercial centre in North America could be attained by improved access by rail and water.

With that objective he laboured and fought for:

 The deepening of the shipping channel in the St. Lawrence river east of Montreal
 The construction of the Victoria Bridge
 The development of canal systems
 The construction of numerous railway lines

In order to attain maximum benefit for Montreal as a commercial centre and as a port, he believed that this improved transportation network must be coupled with the concept of free-trade with the United States.

Many of these ideas were strongly opposed by the Montreal business elite. By reason of his business success, Young was part of that elite, but he was always a bit of an outsider and consider a maverick by many in the "establishment."

Young lived at a time when ideas were held with conviction and strongly debated in public. Sometimes people got "carried away." In 1847, John Young was part of a group of Montreal businessmen involved in a pistol duel. Shots were exchanged but nobody was killed.

Young was successful in business and by about 1850 was able to build a rather magnificent home called Rosemount of the southern slope of the Westmount Mountain. The house is still standing near the corner of Mountain Ave. and Severn.  In his Rosemount home, Young had a very large, oversized, wire-backed armchair. It is believed that this chair was reserved for the ample frame of the Curé Labelle when he came to discuss the building of the railway to serve Saint-Jérôme and the Laurentians. The chair is now property of his great-great-granddaughter.

Politics 
John Young took an active interest in politics where his belief in free trade dictated that he belong to the Parti rouge of Louis-Hippolyte LaFontaine. He was elected to the 4th and 5th Parliaments of the Province of Canada, and served from 1851 to 1858. He was a Cabinet Minister and was made the Chief Commissioner of Public Works. He did not run for re-election in 1858; he ran in 1863 but was defeated by D'Arcy McGee.

After Confederation, he was elected to Parliament in the 1872 federal election in Montreal West for the Liberal Party of Canada.  He did not run for re-election in 1874.

His served on the Montreal Harbour Commission. First appointed in 1850, he became chairman in 1853, pushing for improved transportation. He was also elected President of the Montreal Board of Trade.

He oversaw construction of the Victoria Bridge in Montreal, and was host for the formal inauguration ceremonies attended by the Prince of Wales, H.R.H. Albert, son of Queen Victoria.

Disaster
By the early 1860s Young had retired from any active involvement in his import/export business. He took his wife, Amelia Jane, and 7 of their children back to Scotland where he believed they would be better educated. In May 1863 the family was returning to Canada on the Allan Steamship Line's ship, the Anglo Saxon. In dense fog, the ship struck an iceberg off the coast of Newfoundland.

Out of a total 447 passengers and crew, 238 drowned. John Young and his family all survived. His handwritten letter dated 15 May 1863 gives a dramatic account of the tragedy.

True to John Young's combative nature, he was no sooner back in Montreal than he was fighting with the prominent and powerful Allan family who owned the ill-fated Anglo-Saxon.

Later life and death 

The latter part of Young's life was not easy. While he continued to fight for free trade and improved transportation his financial situation deteriorated. At the time of his life when he was anxious to get some relief – possibly a pension from the Government or Harbour Commission – it appears that his many public disputes with prominent politicians and business leaders caught up with him. No financial help was forthcoming. Instead, Young was given some token appointments, one of them being to represent the Montreal business interests at an International Trade Conference in Australia in 1877. The trip was a difficult one and John became ill. He never recovered and died shortly after his return to Montreal in 1878.

The flourishing Port of Montreal, and its success for the past 150 years are a fine testament to John Young's work and vision.

His statue was erected in 1908. It is the work of distinguished sculptor Louis-Philippe Hébert.

Electoral record

References

 
 
 

1811 births
1878 deaths
Members of the Legislative Assembly of the Province of Canada from Canada East
Members of the House of Commons of Canada from Quebec
Liberal Party of Canada MPs